KKR 03 is a dwarf irregular galaxy located  away from Earth. It has an absolute magnitude of −10.85 and lies on the inner edge of the M94 Group.

See also
List of nearest galaxies

References

External links
 
 

Dwarf irregular galaxies
M94 Group
Canes Venatici
166185
166185